Cernuella virgata, also known as Helicella virgata, common name, the "vineyard snail",  is a species of small, air-breathing land snail, a pulmonate gastropod mollusc in the family Geomitridae.

This species of snail makes and uses love darts.

Shell description 
The shell is from 6 to 19 mm in height and 8 to 25 mm in width.

The coloration of the shell is quite variable, but there is often a creamy-white background, with a variable number of pale to darker brown markings. Some shells are banded at the periphery and on the underside.

Technical description 
For terms see gastropod shell

The 15 x 12–23 mm. shell has 4.5-5.5 convex whorls. The last whorl is initially angulated or rounded. The aperture is rounded with a whitish or reddish lip inside and margin is not reflected, The umbilicus is always open, 1/10-1/6 of shell diameterand sometimes slightly excentric. The colour of the periostracum is whitish or yellowish, sometimes with red hue and usually with two brown colour bands on the upper side and 3-4 narrower bands on the lower side, initially finely ribbed, weakly striated at lower whorls.

Distribution 

This snail is endemic to Mediterranean and Western Europe, including the British Isles. This species has been recovered from the Roman occupation of Volubilis, an archaeological site in present-day Morocco.

Cernuella virgata is an invasive species and an agricultural pest in parts of Australia, where it arrived around 1920. In Australia it is known as the "common white snail".

Another land snail which is present as an invasive in Australia, and which is sometimes confused with Cernuella virgata is the species Theba pisana. It is somewhat similar in appearance, and lives under similar circumstances. Theba pisana is however a larger species with a more inflated shell, lower spire and a nearly covered umbilicus.

Comparison between shells of Cernuella virgata and Theba pisana:

Behavior and human relevance 
This species aestivates after climbing to the top of vegetation (or fences). This habit is problematic for farmers engaged in crop harvesting, because numerous snails are collected along with the crop.

Life cycle 
The size of the egg is 1.5 mm.

Parasites 
Cernuella virgata is as intermediate host for the terrestrial trematode parasite Brachylaima cribbi.

Gastronomy 

Cernuella virgata, with Theba pisana, is consumed in Spain as a "tapa" in the bars, especially in Andalusia, where snails are known as "Chichos" snails.

Synonyms 
 Cernuella (Cernuella) virgata (Da Costa, 1778) · alternate representation
 Cochlea virgata Da Costa, 1778 ·  (original name)
 Helicella (Heliomanes) lineata (Olivi, 1792) · (junior synonym)
 Helicella (Jacosta) jentteri Lindholm, 1926 ·
 Helicella (Xerocincta) neglecta M. R. Alonso, 1975 · (junior synonym)
 Helicella (Xeromagna) submeridionalis M. R. Alonso, 1975 · (junior synonym)
 Helicella virgata (da Costa, 1778) · (superseded generic combination)
 Helix (Helicella) lauta R. T. Lowe, 1831 · (junior synonym)
 Helix (Xerophila) amblia Westerlund, 1893 · (junior synonym)
 Helix (Xerophila) lineata Olivi, 1792 · (superseded combination)
 Helix aglaometa J. Mabille, 1882 · (junior synonym)
 Helix alluvionum Servain, 1880 · (junior synonym)
 Helix aradasii Pirajno, 1842 · (junior synonym)
 Helix blasi Servain, 1880 · (junior synonym)
 Helix canovasiana Servain, 1880 · (junior synonym)
 Helix castroiana Servain, 1880 · (junior synonym)
 Helix edetanorum Servain, 1880 · (junior synonym)
 Helix finitimus Locard, 1899 · (junior synonym)
 Helix grannonensis Bourguignat in Servain, 1880 · (junior synonym)
 Helix hamilcaris Kobelt, 1877 · (junior synonym)
 Helix lineata Olivi, 1792
 Helix lululenta Locard, 1899 · (junior synonym)
 Helix luteata L. Pfeiffer, 1857 · (junior synonym)
 Helix luteola var. minor Servain, 1880 · (junior synonym)
 Helix mendranoi Servain, 1880 · (junior synonym)
 Helix parva L. Pfeiffer, 1848 · (junior synonym)
 Helix phryganophila J. Mabille, 1882 · (junior synonym)
 Helix rufolabris L. Pfeiffer, 1856 · (junior synonym)
 Helix solanoi Servain, 1880 · (junior synonym)
 Helix subluteata Servain, 1880 · (junior synonym)
 Helix tergestina Rossmässler, 1837 · (junior synonym)
 Helix terrosa Locard, 1899 · (junior synonym)
 Helix uberta Locard, 1899 · (junior synonym)
 Helix virgata (da Costa, 1778) · (superseded combination)
 Helix virgata var. alba J. W. Taylor, 1883 · (invalid; name preoccupied)
 Helix virgata var. leucozona J. W. Taylor, 1883 · (invalid; not C. Pfeiffer, 1828)
 Helix virgata var. major J. W. Taylor, 1883 · (invalid; name preoccupied)
 Helix virgata var. minor J. W. Taylor, 1883 · (invalid; name preoccupied)
 Helix xalonica Servain, 1880 · (junior synonym)
 Xerophila virgata (Da Costa, 1778)
 Xerophila virgata croatiae Kormos, 1906 · (suspected synonym)

See also 
 Cernuella neglecta

References 

 Provoost, S.; Bonte, D. (Ed.) (2004). Animated dunes: a view of biodiversity at the Flemish coast [Levende duinen: een overzicht van de biodiversiteit aan de Vlaamse kust]. Mededelingen van het Instituut voor Natuurbehoud, 22. Instituut voor Natuurbehoud: Brussel, Belgium. . 416, ill., appendices pp
 Sysoev, A. V. & Schileyko, A. A. (2009). Land snails and slugs of Russia and adjacent countries. Sofia/Moskva (Pensoft). 312 pp., 142 plates.

External links 

 Cernuella virgata at Animalbase taxonomy, short description, distribution, biology, status (threats), images
 Cernuella virgata images at Encyclopedia of Life
 Fauna Europaea Search Distribution

Geomitridae
Molluscs of the Atlantic Ocean
Molluscs of the Mediterranean Sea
Taxa named by Emanuel Mendes da Costa
Gastropods described in 1778